Enville is a town in Chester and McNairy counties, Tennessee. The population was 230 at the 2000 census and 189 in 2010.

Geography
Enville is located at  (35.388026, -88.420032).

According to the United States Census Bureau, the town has a total area of 1.5 square miles (3.8 km2), all land.

Demographics

As of the census of 2000, there were 230 people, 95 households, and 70 families residing in the town. The population density was 157.9 people per square mile (60.8/km2). There were 115 housing units at an average density of 79.0 per square mile (30.4/km2). The racial makeup of the town was 97.39% White and 2.61% African American. Hispanic or Latino of any race were 1.30% of the population.

There were 95 households, out of which 25.3% had children under the age of 18 living with them, 61.1% were married couples living together, 7.4% had a female householder with no husband present, and 25.3% were non-families. 22.1% of all households were made up of individuals, and 16.8% had someone living alone who was 65 years of age or older. The average household size was 2.42 and the average family size was 2.77.

In the town, the population was spread out, with 20.9% under the age of 18, 5.7% from 18 to 24, 25.7% from 25 to 44, 23.5% from 45 to 64, and 24.3% who were 65 years of age or older. The median age was 43 years. For every 100 females, there were 96.6 males. For every 100 females age 18 and over, there were 83.8 males.

The median income for a household in the town was $29,722, and the median income for a family was $37,083. Males had a median income of $29,750 versus $26,250 for females. The per capita income for the town was $14,199. About 17.3% of families and 16.4% of the population were below the poverty line, including 7.3% of those under the age of eighteen and 33.3% of those sixty-five or over.

References

External links
 
MTAS entry for Enville — information on local government, elections, and link to charter

Towns in Chester County, Tennessee
Towns in McNairy County, Tennessee
Towns in Tennessee
Jackson metropolitan area, Tennessee